The Voice Senior is a Polish reality talent show premiered on December 7, 2019, on the TVP 2 television network. The Voice Senior is part of the international syndication The Voice and The Voice Kids based on the reality singing competition launched in the Netherlands as The Voice of Holland, created by Dutch television producer John de Mol. However, participation is only open for candidates of more than 60 years old.

Format
The show consists of four different phases: production audition, blind audition, the "sing off" and the live finale. The production auditions are not filmed; here only the good singers are selected by the program to go to the blind auditions.

The Blind auditions
The blind auditions are similar to The Voice of Poland and The Voice Kids. The contestants sing during the blind auditions while the chairs of the four judges/coaches are turned over. Each candidate has the chance to sing a song of their choice for about a minute and a half. The coaches can only choose the contestant on the basis of musicality and voice by pressing the button, causing their chairs turn around and facing the artist. If two or more coaches want the same artist, the artist can choose which coach he or she wants to continue in the program. The Blind Auditions will end when all teams are full.

The Semifinal
Each coach pairs two or three singers from his team who have to compete against each other by performing a song chosen by the coach. After the performances, the coach chooses one contestant from each pair to advance to the next round. In the end, every coach retains two contestants.

The Live Finale
The remaining two contestants from each team will be in the final. The live finale will be broadcast live on TVP 2. The contestants are mentored by their coach and choose a song that they want to sing in the final. The coach then decides one act to remain; the other act will then be eliminated. The final winner is chosen by the public at home by televoting.

Coaches and presenters
On July 19, 2019, it was announced that Marek Piekarczyk, Urszula Dudziak, Alicja Majewska and Andrzej Piaseczny would become coaches for the show's first season, with Tomasz Kammel joining Marta Manowska as hosts.
On August 17, 2020, it was announced that Majewska and Piaseczny would return as coaches, meanwhile new coaches Izabela Trojanowska and Witold Paszt will replace Marek Piekarczyk and Urszula Dudziak in the second season.
On August 18, 2021, it was announced that Majewska and Paszt would return as the coaches, meanwhile Andrzej Piaseczny and Izabela Trojanowska would be replaced by Piotr Cugowski and Maryla Rodowicz in the third season.
On August 16, 2022, it was announced that Rodowicz and Cugowski would return as the coaches, meanwhile Witold Paszt and Alicja Majewska would be replaced by Alicja Węgorzewska and Tomasz Szczepanik in the fourth season.

Coaches timeline

Timeline of hosts

Key
 Main presenter
 Backstage presenter

Coaches and finalists 

Winners are in bold, other finalists in italic, eliminated artists in smaller font.
   
 rowspan="2"| 5

Season summary 
Warning: the following table presents a significant amount of different colors.

Season 1 (2019)

The show premiered on December 7, 2019.
The judges for season 1 were Andrzej Piaseczny, Alicja Majewska, Urszula Dudziak and Marek Piekarczyk. The show was hosted by Tomasz Kammel, Marta Manowska and Janina Busk. The winners of the first series were Jola, Krystyna & Ela Szydłowskie from Team Urszula.

Season 2 (2021)

The second season of the show premiered on January 2, 2021. Alicja Majewska and Andrzej Piaseczny returned as the coaches in the second season, but Urszula Dudziak and Marek Piekarczyk are replaced by Izabela Trojanowska and Witold Paszt, as new coaches. The show was hosted by Rafał Brzozowski and Marta Manowska. Tomasz Kammel resigned from the function of presenter. The winner of the second series was Barbara Parzeczewska from Team Andrzej.

Season 3 (2022)

The third season of the show premiered on January 1, 2022. Alicja Majewska and Witold Paszt returned as the coaches in the third season, but Izabela Trojanowska and Andrzej Piaseczny were replaced by Maryla Rodowicz and Piotr Cugowski, as new coaches. The show was hosted by Rafał Brzozowski and Marta Manowska. The winner of the third series was Krzysztof Prusik from Team Witold.

Season 4 (2023) 

The fourth season of the show premiered on January 7, 2023. On August 16, 2022, it was announced that Maryla Rodowicz and Piotr Cugowski would return as the coaches, meanwhile Witold Paszt and Alicja Majewska would be replaced by Alicja Węgorzewska and Tomasz Szczepanik as a new coaches. The show was hosted by Rafał Brzozowski and Małgorzata Tomaszewska, who replaced Marta Manowska. The winner of the fourth series was Zbigniew Zaranek from Team Maryla.

References 

The Voice of Poland
Telewizja Polska original programming
2010s Polish television series